"Crazy Love" is a song by UK garage musician MJ Cole, released on 24 April 2000 as the second single from his debut album Sincere. Elisabeth Troy Antwi provides vocals on the song. The song peaked at  10 on the UK Singles Chart, No. 1 on the UK Dance Singles Chart, and No. 17 in Iceland. In the United States, exactly one year after its UK release, the song was serviced to rhythmic radio and reached No. 22 on the Billboard Dance Club Songs chart.

In 2019, DJ Spoony together with Katie Chatburn and the Ignition Orchestra featuring Emeli Sandé on vocals recorded an orchestral version of the song for the UK garage covers album Garage Classical. In March 2019, for Dummy Mag, the Heartless Crew included "Crazy Love" in their list of "The 10 Best UK Garage Tunes".

Track listings
UK CD single
 "Crazy Love" (radio edit) – 3:33
 "Attitude" – 5:23
 "Crazy Love" (Todd Edwards Discofied 2000 remix) – 6:19
 "Crazy Love" (video)

UK 12-inch single
A1. "Crazy Love" – 4:38
A2. "Crazy Love" (Todd Edwards Save Your Crys dub) – 6:29
B1. "Attitude" – 5:23

US 12-inch single
A1. "Crazy Love" (Riprock 'N' Alex G radio edit) – 3:33
A2. "Crazy Love" (Todd Edwards Discofied 2000 vocal mix) – 6:19
A3. "Crazy Dubb" – 5:23
B1. "Crazy Love" (London Underground main mix) – 6:13
B2. "Sincere" (Naked Music Jay's Breakfast dub) – 6:09

Credits and personnel
Credits are taken from the UK CD single liner notes.

Studios
 Recorded at Prolific Studios
 Mixed at Soho Recording Studios (London, England)
 Artwork designed at Intro (London, England)

Personnel
 MJ Cole – writing (as Matt Coleman), production, mixing, engineering
 Elisabeth Troy Antwi – writing, vocals
 Alan Mawdsley – assistant mix engineering
 Michael Williams – art direction
 Merton Gauster – photography

Charts

Certifications

Release history

References

2000 songs
2000 singles
MJ Cole songs
Island Records singles
Mercury Records singles
Talkin' Loud singles